Benjamin Franklin Wilson (June 2, 1921 – March 1, 1988) was a soldier in the United States Army during the Korean War. He received the Medal of Honor for his actions on June 5, 1951, during the UN May–June 1951 counteroffensive.

Biography
Born at Vashon, Washington on June 2, 1921, he enlisted in the Army in the summer of 1940 and was stationed at Schofield Barracks, Hawaii, when the Japanese attacked Pearl Harbor. He went to OCS at Fort Sill, Oklahoma in 1943 and was commissioned in the Field Artillery, but when the war was over, he resigned his commission and went home. His departure was only temporary. The Army suited him much better than Washington's lumber mills, and he was back in uniform nine months later. Because the Army was thinning its officer ranks and had no room for an inexperienced lieutenant, he enlisted as a private. He rose quickly through the ranks to become I Company's first sergeant by the summer of 1951.

First Sergeant Wilson's company was ordered to take the largest hill (later dubbed "Hell Hill") overlooking the Hwachon Reservoir on June 4, 1951. Wounded in action, Wilson was being carried down the hill on a stretcher as the battle neared its climax. When his stretcher-bearers set him down to rest, Wilson, in obvious pain, arose from the stretcher and trudged back up the hill without a word. The very next day, he distinguished himself in an I Company attack on a well-fortified position, earning himself the Medal of Honor. On June 6, just one day after that exploit, First Sergeant Ben Wilson killed 33 more Chinese soldiers with his rifle, bayonet, and hand grenades in another one-man assault. In the process, he reopened the wounds he suffered the day before and was finally evacuated to a hospital. He was again recommended for the Medal of Honor, but Army policy prohibited any man from being awarded more than one. Wilson received the Distinguished Service Cross instead and was commissioned when he returned to the States. He retired from the Army as a major in 1960 and died in Hawaii in 1988.

Medal of Honor citation
Rank and organization: First Lieutenant (then M/Sgt.), U.S. Army Company I, 31st Infantry Regiment, 7th Infantry Division

Place and date: Near Hwach'on-Myon, Korea, June 5, 1951

Entered service at: Vashon, Wash. Birth: Vashon, Washington

G.O. No.: 69, September 23, 1954

Citation:
1st Lt. Wilson distinguished himself by conspicuous gallantry and indomitable courage above and beyond the call of duty in action against the enemy. Company I was committed to attack and secure commanding terrain stubbornly defended by a numerically superior hostile force emplaced in well-fortified positions. When the spearheading element was pinned down by withering hostile fire, he dashed forward and, firing his rifle and throwing grenades, neutralized the position denying the advance and killed 4 enemy soldiers manning submachineguns. After the assault platoon moved up, occupied the position, and a base of fire was established, he led a bayonet attack which reduced the objective and killed approximately 27 hostile soldiers. While friendly forces were consolidating the newly won gain, the enemy launched a counterattack and 1st Lt. Wilson, realizing the imminent threat of being overrun, made a determined lone-man charge, killing 7 and wounding 2 of the enemy, and routing the remainder in disorder. After the position was organized, he led an assault carrying to approximately 15 yards of the final objective, when enemy fire halted the advance. He ordered the platoon to withdraw and, although painfully wounded in this action, remained to provide covering fire. During an ensuing counterattack, the commanding officer and 1st Platoon leader became casualties. Unhesitatingly, 1st Lt. Wilson charged the enemy ranks and fought valiantly, killing 3 enemy soldiers with his rifle before it was wrested from his hands, and annihilating 4 others with his entrenching tool. His courageous delaying action enabled his comrades to reorganize and effect an orderly withdrawal. While directing evacuation of the wounded, he suffered a second wound, but elected to remain on the position until assured that all of the men had reached safety. 1st Lt. Wilson's sustained valor and intrepid actions reflect utmost credit upon himself and uphold the honored traditions of the military service.

See also

List of Medal of Honor recipients
List of Korean War Medal of Honor recipients

Notes

References
Picture of Benjamin Wilson on Pinterest.com

1921 births
1988 deaths
People from Vashon, Washington
Military personnel from Washington (state)
United States Army personnel of World War II
United States Army officers
United States Army personnel of the Korean War
Recipients of the Distinguished Service Cross (United States)
Korean War recipients of the Medal of Honor
United States Army Medal of Honor recipients
Burials in the National Memorial Cemetery of the Pacific